Consonant clusters in Bengali are very common word-initially due to a long history of borrowing from English and Sanskrit, two languages with a large cluster inventory. A smaller number of words with word-final clusters have also been borrowed from English and Persian. A handful of words from non-standard dialects of Bengali include native clusters.

Syllable-initial clusters

Native Bengali (তদ্ভব tôdbhôbo) words do not allow initial consonant clusters; the maximum syllabic structure is CVC (i.e. one vowel flanked by a consonant on each side). Many speakers of Bengali restrict their phonology to this pattern, even when using Sanskrit or English borrowings, such as গেরাম geram (CV.CVC) for গ্রাম gram (CCVC) "village" or ইস্কুল iskul (VC.CVC) for স্কুল skul (CCVC) "school".

Sanskrit (তৎসম tôtshômo) words borrowed into Bengali, however, possess a wide range of clusters, expanding the maximum syllable structure to CCCVC. Some of these clusters, such as the mr in মৃত্যু mrittu "death" or the sp in স্পষ্ট spôshṭo "clear", have become extremely common, and can be considered legal consonant clusters in Bengali.

English and other foreign (বিদেশী bideshi) borrowings add even more cluster types into the Bengali inventory, further increasing the syllable capacity to CCCVCCCC, as commonly used loanwords such as ট্রেন ṭren "train" and গ্লাস glash "glass" are now even included in leading Bengali dictionaries.

Syllable-final clusters

Final consonant clusters are rare in Bengali. Most final consonant clusters were borrowed into Bengali from English, as in লিফ্‌ট lifṭ "lift, elevator" and ব্যাংক bêngk "bank". However, final clusters do exist in some native Bengali words, although rarely in standard pronunciation. One example of a final cluster in a standard Bengali word would be গঞ্জ gônj, which is found in names of hundreds of cities and towns across Bengal, including নবাবগঞ্জ Nôbabgônj and মানিকগঞ্জ Manikgônj. Some nonstandard varieties of Bengali make use of final clusters quite often. For example, in some Purbo (eastern) dialects, final consonant clusters consisting of a nasal and its corresponding oral stop are common, as in চান্দ chand "moon". The Standard Bengali equivalent of chand would be চাঁদ chãd, with a nasalized vowel instead of the final cluster.

Notes

References 
 

Bengali language
Phonotactics
Phonetics
Phonology